Blight is a symptom affecting plants in response to infection.

Blight may also refer to:
 Blight or urban decay; abandoned, derelict, or severely neglected buildings and lots, slums

Fiction
 Blight, a character from Transformers: Energon
 Derek Powers / Blight, a supervillain in the animated series Batman Beyond
 Amity Blight, a character in the animated series The Owl House
 Dr. Blight, a villain in the animated series Captain Planet and the Planeteers
 The Blight, terraforming microbes in Outpost 2: Divided Destiny
 The Blight, a malevolent quasi-Power in the novel A Fire Upon the Deep
 Blight, a group of worlds devastated by a dangerous technology in the book Worlds of the Imperium
 Blight, a character in the Hunger Games novel Catching Fire and the associated film

Other uses
 Blight (band), a hardcore punk band from Lansing
 Blight (play), a 1917 play by Oliver St. John Gogarty
 Blight (surname)

See also
 Blighty (disambiguation)